For a Good Latvia (also known as (AŠ)²) was a Latvian right-wing party alliance founded on 22 April 2010 by the People's Party, Latvia's First Party/Latvian Way, the businessmen's movement For a Good Latvia and some smaller parties. The initial name (AŠ)² referred to the initials of the party leaders of the People's Party (Andris Šķēle) and LPP/LC (Ainārs Šlesers). Both major parties participating had been doing badly in the polls. The alliance was headed by former Latvian president Guntis Ulmanis. 

In the 2010 parliamentary election it won a disappointing 8 seats and did not join the governing coalition. In July 2011 the People's Party was dissolved and Ainārs Šlesers' LPP/LC renamed itself the Ainars Šlesers LPP/LC Reform Party, by analogy with the Zatlers' Reform Party. The parliamentary faction of "For a Good Latvia", however, continued to exist until the end of the 10th Saeima and was headed by Edgars Zalāns. In the elections of September 2011, Ainars Šlesers LPP/LC Reform Party failed to win any seats.

References

External links
 Official website 

Conservative parties in Latvia
Political parties established in 2010
Defunct political party alliances in Latvia
2010 establishments in Latvia